James Larnell Harris (born July 20, 1947) is an American former professional football player and executive. He played as a quarterback in the American Football League (AFL) and the National Football League (NFL) with the Buffalo Bills, Los Angeles Rams, and San Diego Chargers. He was later a personnel executive for the Baltimore Ravens, Jacksonville Jaguars and Detroit Lions. Harris is the inspiration for the song "Ramblin' Man From Gramblin'" composed by Sam Spence. He is nicknamed "Shack", which is short for Meshach, given to him by his Baptist minister father.

College football career
Harris played college football for the Grambling State University Tigers from 1965 to 1968.  Under the guidance of head coach Eddie Robinson, Grambling won or shared all four Southwestern Athletic Conference (SWAC) titles while Harris was a player and he was named MVP of the 1967 Orange Blossom Classic. Harris was specifically trained as a prototypical pocket-passer by Robinson and broke numerous passing records at Grambling.

Professional football career

Buffalo Bills
Harris was drafted in the eighth round of the 1969 Common Draft by the American Football League's Buffalo Bills, and would soon join fellow rookie O. J. Simpson in the starting backfield.  Continuing the American Football League's more liberal (than the NFL's) personnel policies, the Bills made Harris the first black player to start a season at quarterback in the history of pro football. Harris was also just the second black player in the modern era to start in any game as quarterback for a professional football team. Wide receiver Marlin Briscoe, of the AFL's Denver Broncos, had been the first to start a game at quarterback in 1968, and a few of Harris's completions in 1969 went to Briscoe, who, by that time, had been traded to the Bills and had been converted to the position of receiver. In the first game of the season against the defending champion New York Jets, he went 3-of-12 for 74 yards with an interception while making a run for six yards before being replaced by Jack Kemp (playing his final season) as the Bills were trounced 33-19. It was his only start for the season, and Harris threw just 24 total passes combined in the other three games he appeared in as the team went 4–10. He scored his first touchdown on a throw to Haven Moses for 39 yards in a 50-21 loss to the Oakland Raiders. He made no starts in 1970, going 24-of-50 for 338 yards with three touchdowns and four interceptions in a year where the Bills went 3-10-1 while using newly drafted Dennis Shaw as their main starter. For his third and last year with the team, he made two starts (both losses) with seven appearances, going 51-of-103 for 512 total yards with one touchdown and six interceptions. After three years with the Bills, Harris was released by the team and signed by the Los Angeles Rams in 1972.

Los Angeles Rams
In 1973, Harris was the understudy to veteran John Hadl as the Rams went 12-2 and returned to the playoffs for the first time since 1969. As the 1974 season began, the Rams offense sputtered under Hadl and the team stood at 3-2 after five games. In an effort to spark the Los Angeles offense, Rams head coach Chuck Knox promoted Harris as the starting quarterback. In his starting debut for the Rams against the San Francisco 49ers, Harris completed 12 of 15 passes for 276 yards and three touchdowns and rushed for another as the Rams won easily, 37-14, at the Los Angeles Coliseum. The performance earned Harris a perfect passer rating for the game. Two days later, Hadl was then traded to Green Bay, and Harris became the Rams' first-string quarterback for the remainder of the 1974 season. The football world was stunned by the bold move. However, Harris came through by leading the team to seven wins in its last nine regular-season games. He led the team to its second straight NFC Western Division title, as well as their first playoff victory (19-10 over the Washington Redskins) since 1951. Harris thus became the first African-American quarterback to start and win an NFL playoff game. The Rams lost the NFC Championship Game to the Minnesota Vikings 14-10. Harris was named to the NFC Pro Bowl team in 1974 and was awarded MVP of that game.

The strong-armed Harris helped lead the team to another division title in 1975. Harris, in turn, became the first African-American to open a season as his team's starting quarterback in National Football League history.  However, he injured his shoulder very early in the Rams' Week 13 win over the Green Bay Packers; backup Ron Jaworski then led the Rams to wins against Green Bay and the Super Bowl Champion Pittsburgh Steelers, as well as to a 35-23 win over the St. Louis Cardinals in the divisional playoff game. Stating that a "player cannot lose his starting job due to injury," Knox named Harris the starter for the NFC Championship games vs. Dallas, as he appeared to be recovered from his injury. Harris' first pass was intercepted, and after one more incompletion and a Dallas 21-0 first-quarter lead, he was pulled in favor of Jaworski. It didn't matter as Dallas went on to a 37-7 win.

Harris' injuries continued to give him problems in the 1976 season.  The Rams went with three quarterbacks; Harris, Jaworski, and rookie Pat Haden from USC.  With Harris injured, Jaworski opened the season as the starter and was injured in the opener.  Haden led the team to a comeback tie against the Minnesota Vikings in the second game.  Harris, with his throwing shoulder mended, reclaimed his starting job and led the team to two wins, including a 436-yard passing performance against the Miami Dolphins.  However, in the next game, on Monday night at home against the San Francisco 49ers, Harris was sacked 10 times and re-injured his shoulder as the Rams were shut out 16-0 at home for the first time since moving to Los Angeles.  The Jaworski/Haden platoon led the team to two more wins, then Harris returned again for a win over the then-first-year Seattle Seahawks and a loss to the Cincinnati Bengals. Against the Bengals, however, Harris played poorly and Knox felt like Harris was not fully healthy. After the game, Knox decided to go with Haden as the starter for the rest of the season. Under Haden, the Rams won three out of four and the NFC West division title.  Knox stuck with Haden in the 1976 playoffs, even though Harris was healthy enough to see action late in the season, including a season-ending comeback win over the Detroit Lions. In the NFC title game, the stout Minnesota defense harassed Haden the entire game as the Vikings beat the Rams 24-13 to advance to Super Bowl XI. Despite the benching, Harris' 89.6 passer rating that year was tied for the highest in the NFC. It was the first time a black quarterback ever led his conference in that category.

San Diego Chargers
Harris was traded to the San Diego Chargers prior to the 1977 season. The experience with the Rams hurt him. "I lost my passion," he said in the book Third and a Mile. "Coach Knox was supportive but the owner Carroll Rosenbloom was going over his head.

"As a quarterback, I had done all I could, more than most people could, but it still wasn't enough for the Los Angeles Rams organization to accept me as a quarterback, not a black quarterback," he commented. At the time of his departure, Harris held the highest career completion average of any quarterback in Rams team history (55.4%) and had been an integral part of three straight NFC West Champions. Harris was deeply upset by his trade from a perennial playoff team to a team in rebuilding mode and also by losing his status as a starting quarterback. Nonetheless, Harris maintained a good relationship with Chuck Knox until the latter's death in 2018.

He made nine starts in his first year due to Dan Fouts holding out for more money, going 4–5 while throwing 109-for-211 with 1,240 yards, five touchdowns and 11 interceptions. The following year, he played in nine games while starting two of them, throwing 42-of-88 for 518 yards, two touchdowns and nine interceptions. Harris last saw playing time in 1979, appearing in eight games and throwing just 5-of-9 for 38 yards with an interception.

Front office career
Harris served as the Baltimore Ravens Director of Pro Personnel from  1997 to 2003. During his tenure, the Ravens won Super Bowl XXXV. In 2003, Harris left the Ravens organization and went on to serve as the Vice President of Player Personnel for the Jacksonville Jaguars, resigning on December 23, 2008.  He also served on the NFL subcommittee on college relations.

On February 2, 2009, the Detroit Free Press reported that the Detroit Lions were set to hire Harris as a personnel executive. On February 12, 2009, the Detroit Lions officially named Harris as Senior Personnel Executive.  Lions General Manager Martin Mayhew has a long history with Harris, and indicated he was the only individual who was offered the job.  Harris assisted in all areas of player personnel in an advisory role. He is no longer employed by the NFL. He officially "retired from the NFL" on February 27, 2015.

Honors
Harris has been inducted into the Southwestern Athletic Conference Hall of Fame, the Grambling Athletic Hall of Fame,  the Louisiana Sports Hall of Fame.Black College Football Hall of Fame and the National Quarterback Club Hall of Fame  .

See also
 List of American Football League players
 Racial issues faced by black quarterbacks

References

External links
 

1947 births
Living people
American football quarterbacks
Baltimore Ravens executives
Buffalo Bills players
Detroit Lions executives
Grambling State Tigers football players
Jacksonville Jaguars executives
Los Angeles Rams players
San Diego Chargers players
National Conference Pro Bowl players
Sportspeople from Monroe, Louisiana
African-American sports executives and administrators
American sports executives and administrators
American Football League players
African-American players of American football
21st-century African-American people
20th-century African-American sportspeople